Jerry Wayne Hairston Jr. (born May 29, 1976) is an American former professional baseball infielder and outfielder. He played 16 seasons in Major League Baseball (MLB) for the Baltimore Orioles, Chicago Cubs, Texas Rangers, Cincinnati Reds, New York Yankees, San Diego Padres, Washington Nationals, Milwaukee Brewers, and Los Angeles Dodgers. He played every position except pitcher and catcher during his baseball career. He is the grandson of former major leaguer Sam Hairston, the son of former major leaguer Jerry Hairston Sr., and the brother of Scott Hairston. He helped the Yankees win the 2009 World Series, beating the Philadelphia Phillies, giving him his only World Series title.

High school and college
In High School, he was a two-time All-State selection at Naperville North High School in baseball and an all-area selection in basketball. He was drafted in the 42nd round of the 1995 Major League Baseball draft by the Baltimore Orioles but chose instead to go to college.

Hairston played college ball at Southern Illinois University in 1996 and 1997, where he batted .360 for his career and was the Missouri Valley Conference Freshman of the Year in 1996. In both years he played collegiate summer baseball in the Cape Cod Baseball League, playing for the Bourne Braves in 1996, and the Wareham Gatemen in 1997. He was later inducted as a member of the Southern Illinois Baseball Hall of Fame.

Professional career

Baltimore Orioles
Hairston was drafted in the 11th round of the 1997 Major League Baseball draft by the Baltimore Orioles. He made his professional debut in 1997 with the rookie-league Bluefield Orioles, where he hit .330 in 59 games. In 1998, he made a fast rise up the farm system, starting in A with the Frederick Keys, where he played in 80 games and hit .302, then he was promoted to the AA Bowie Baysox, where he hit .326 in 55 games and received a September promotion to the Major Leagues.

He made his major league debut with the Orioles on September 11, 1998 against the Anaheim Angels at second base, he was hitless in three at-bats in that game. He appeared in a total of 7 games in 1998, primarily as a pinch runner or late inning defensive replacement, and did not get a hit in 7 at-bats. In 1999 and 2000, he split his time between the AAA Rochester Red Wings and the Orioles. He recorded his first Major League hit on June 27, 1999 off of New York Yankees pitcher Orlando Hernández and his first home run came off of Joey Hamilton of the Toronto Blue Jays on July 1, 1999. He had fairly regular playing time with the Orioles in 2001 and 2002 and was used more as a utility player in 2003 and 2004.

In his seven seasons with Baltimore, he played in 558 games, batting .261.

Chicago Cubs
He was traded (along with Oriole prospects Mike Fontenot and David Crouthers) to the Chicago Cubs in the 2005 offseason for Sammy Sosa. The Cubs attempted to use Hairston as a leadoff man, but he finished the 2005 season with an unremarkable on-base percentage of .336 and stole only 8 bases in 17 attempts. Even though most Cubs fans initially welcomed the dismissal of Sosa—whose performance was on the decline and was seen as a problematic teammate—the poor play of Hairston would eventually cause many fans to sour on this particular trade. In two seasons with the Cubs, he hit .251 in 152 games.

Texas Rangers
Hairston's statistics declined further at the start of the 2006 season, and on May 31, he was traded to the Texas Rangers for Phil Nevin. Hairston was released from the Rangers after the 2006 season but re-signed to a minor league contract with an invitation to spring training. Hairston won a spot on the opening day roster, as a reserve outfielder and utility player. A series of injuries to teammates Hank Blalock, Ian Kinsler, Mark Teixeira, and Frank Catalanotto, as well as the trades of Teixeira and Kenny Lofton, led to Hairston playing on a regular basis throughout the 2007 season. Hairston became a free agent after the season. In his two seasons with Texas, he hit .194 in 136 games.

Cincinnati Reds
On a March afternoon in 2008, Hairston received a call from newly hired Reds manager Dusty Baker. Baker had managed Hairston while on the Cubs. He had called him to inform him that the Reds needed an infielder to replace the injured Alex Gonzalez, and invited him to spring training. Because of this, Hairston credits Baker with creating the possibility for him to have a career after struggling in 2006 and 2007.On March 3, 2008, Hairston signed a minor league contract with the Cincinnati Reds. On April 21, his contract was purchased by the Reds and he was added to the roster. Hairston enjoyed a nice bounce-back season in 2008, hitting .326 with an on-base percentage of .384 across 297 plate appearances. He also had 15 stolen bases, his most since 2002, despite only playing in 80 games. He was re-signed after the season, on January 7, 2009, to a one-year contract; the contract contained $2 million in guaranteed money. While his numbers did decline sharply in 2009, he appeared in 131 games between the Reds and Yankees, his most since 2001. In two seasons with the Reds, he hit .287 in 166 games.

World Baseball Classic
Hairston represented Mexico at the 2009 World Baseball Classic alongside his brother Scott. Hairston's mother was born in Mexico, making him eligible to play for the Mexican team. He had 4 hits in 14 at-bats in the Classic.

New York Yankees

On July 31, 2009, he was traded to the New York Yankees for minor league catcher Chase Weems. On August 1, 2009, Hairston got his first hit and RBI as a Yankee. On October 17, 2009, he got his first career post-season hit in his first career post-season at-bat and later ended a 13-inning ALCS Game 2 by scoring on an error by the Angels' Maicer Izturis. This gave the Yankees a 2–0 advantage going into the third game of the series. He had 1 hit in 6 at-bats for the Yankees in the 2009 World Series. In his half season with the Yanks, he hit .237 with 2 homeruns and 12 RBIs in 45 games.

San Diego Padres
On January 18, 2010, Hairston signed a one-year, $2.15 million contract with the San Diego Padres, the same team as his brother, Scott Hairston, was playing on. Hairston's 2010 season was cut short in September with a fractured right tibia, but he still played in 119 games with the Padres, hitting .244 with a career high 10 homeruns (tied with 2009) and 50 RBIs despite playing his home games at notoriously pitcher friendly Petco Park.

Washington Nationals

On January 19, 2011, Hairston agreed to a one-year, $2 million contract with the Washington Nationals that included over $1 million in incentives. He played in 75 games for them, hitting .268.

Milwaukee Brewers
On July 30, 2011, Hairston was traded to the Milwaukee Brewers for Double-A outfielder Erik Komatsu. He played in 45 games for the Brewers, hitting .274.

Los Angeles Dodgers
On December 5, 2011, the Los Angeles Dodgers signed Hairston to a two-year contract worth $6 million.

On June 1, 2012, Hairston was part of a Dodgers lineup that featured the sons of five former major leaguers (along with Tony Gwynn Jr., Iván DeJesús Jr., Dee Gordon and Scott Van Slyke). This was the first time in Major League history that this had occurred. It was also the first time a starting infield of four major league sons had ever occurred: first baseman Van Slyke, second baseman Hairston, third baseman De Jesus and shortstop Gordon.

On August 22, it was determined that Hairston would need surgery on his left hip. The injury had bothered him for some time before he finally went on the disabled list on August 13. The surgery would sideline him for the rest of the season. In 78 games with the Dodgers in 2012, Hairston hit .273 while playing numerous different positions.

In 2013, Hairston was a key reserve for the Dodgers, playing 28 games at third base, 23 in left field, 4 in right field, 13 at first base and 1 at second base. He struggled with the bat however, hitting just .211.

Broadcasting career

On December 11, 2013, it was announced that Hairston would be retiring as an active player to join the Dodgers pre and post game broadcasting crew on SportsNet LA.

Performance-enhancing drugs controversy

According to Luis Fernando Llosa and L. Jon Wertheim, Hairston received genotropin, human chorionic gonadotropin (hCG), and clomiphene citrate in 2004. One of Hairston's prescriptions was written by "A. Almarashi." Investigators believe Almarashi is an alias for a Queens, N.Y., doctor stripped of her medical license in 1999. She is awaiting trial on multiple charges after allegedly writing bogus prescriptions for thousands of online customers she never examined. Hairston denied any connection, stating "Not one time have I taken steroids or anything like that. [ . . .] I would never do anything like that to jeopardize my career or my family's name."

On December 13, 2007, he was cited in the Mitchell Report to the Commissioner of Baseball of an Independent Investigation Into the Illegal Use of Steroids and Other Performance Enhancing Substances by Players in Major League Baseball.

Personal life
Jerry's brother Scott is also a professional baseball player. Their father Jerry Hairston Sr. and grandfather Sam Hairston were also major league players, making him the first African American to be a third-generation major-leaguer. Hairston's heritage is also Mexican American on his mother's side. His uncle Johnny Hairston also played in the majors. Several other family members have also played in the minor leagues.

He attended Naperville North High School in Naperville, Illinois and Southern Illinois University. Hairston became a Jehovah's Witness in July 2000.

See also
 Third-generation Major League Baseball families
 List of Major League Baseball players named in the Mitchell Report

References and citations

External links

, or Retrosheet, or The Baseball Gauge, or Venezuela Winter League

1976 births
2009 World Baseball Classic players
Aberdeen IronBirds players
African-American baseball players
Albuquerque Isotopes players
American baseball players of Mexican descent
Baltimore Orioles players
Baseball players from Chicago
Baseball players from Des Moines, Iowa
Bluefield Orioles players
Bourne Braves players
Bowie Baysox players
Chicago Cubs players
Cincinnati Reds players
Frederick Keys players
Frisco RoughRiders players
Gulf Coast Orioles players
Harrisburg Senators players
Iowa Cubs players
Leones del Caracas players
American expatriate baseball players in Venezuela
Living people
Los Angeles Dodgers announcers
Los Angeles Dodgers players
Louisville Bats players
Major League Baseball broadcasters
Major League Baseball second basemen
Milwaukee Brewers players
Naranjeros de Hermosillo players
New York Yankees players
Oklahoma RedHawks players
Rancho Cucamonga Quakes players
Rochester Red Wings players
San Diego Padres players
Southern Illinois Salukis baseball players
Southern Illinois University alumni
Sportspeople from Naperville, Illinois
Texas Rangers players
Washington Nationals players
American Jehovah's Witnesses
Converts to Jehovah's Witnesses
Wareham Gatemen players
21st-century African-American sportspeople
20th-century African-American sportspeople